Patricia Joan Remak-Boerenstam (born July 16, 1965, in Amsterdam) is a former Dutch civil servant and politician of Surinamese descent. As a member of the People's Party for Freedom and Democracy (VVD) she was a Ward Alderman ('stadsdeelwethouder') of the ward ('stadsdeel') Amsterdam Southeast from 1997 to 1998, a member of the House of Representatives from 1998 to 2002 and a member of the States-Provincial of the province of North Holland from 2003 to 2007 (from 2005 as an independent). In 2008 she was convicted of fraud.

Career
Remak studied tax law at Leiden University. Before she became an MP, she was a ward alderman in the ward Amsterdam south east. Her portfolio contained welfare, sport and finances. In the House of Representatives, her portfolio included finances (taxes), development aid and state expenditure. When she left the House of Representatives, Remak joined  the VVD group in the States-Provincial of the province of North Holland in 2003. In June 2005 she left the VVD group, after major political differences' and continued as an independent member of the States-Provincial.

Fraud
Remak was convicted of benefit fraud in January 2007. She received benefits (wachtgeld) from her former job as MP, although she was not entitled to do so since she had a substantial income from her work as a member of States-Provincial and tax inspector. She failed to inform the UWV (the government body responsible for benefits) about her income, as is required by law. Some days before this conviction became public, she resigned as member of States-Provincial. Remak was first convicted to 1 year imprisonment (3 months on probation). She appealed the ruling. One year later, the Amsterdam court convicted Remak to 6 months imprisonment (3 months on probation) and 240 hours of community service in January 2008.

The province of North Holland launched an investigation into her period as member of States-Provincial and filed a complaint for fraud and forgery. These allegations were connected to payments of almost 28,000 euro to a party assistant who also worked for her husband's company.

Wikipedia
In June 2008 Remak demanded that the Dutch-language version of Wikipedia (and the blog GeenStijl.nl) remove the information on her conviction for fraud. She based her demand on Dutch privacy law. Wikipedia initially complied with her wishes; the information was restored in June 2008 on legal advice.

References

External links
 Parlement.com biography
 "Remak stapt uit VVD-fractie", Provincie Noord-Holland, June 10, 2005.
 "Voormalig VVD-Kamerlid de cel in voor fraude", de Volkskrant, January 12, 2007.
 "Remak stapt op als statenlid", RTV Noord-Holland, January 9, 2007.

1965 births
Living people
Aldermen of Amsterdam
Dutch civil servants
Dutch fraudsters
21st-century Dutch criminals
Dutch people of the Moravian Church
Dutch people of Surinamese descent
Dutch women in politics
Dutch women jurists
Leiden University alumni
Members of the House of Representatives (Netherlands)
Members of the Provincial Council of North Holland
Municipal councillors of Amsterdam
Criminals from Amsterdam
People's Party for Freedom and Democracy politicians
Politicians convicted of fraud
Vrije Universiteit Amsterdam alumni